Lerista edwardsae, also known commonly as the Myall slider,  is a species of skink, a lizard in the family Scincidae. The species is endemic to the Australian state of South Australia.

Etymology
The specific name, edwardsae, is in honor of Australian herpetologist Adrienne Edwards.

Habitat
The preferred natural habitats of L. edwardsae are forest and shrubland.

Description
L. edwardsae has no front legs, and each back leg has two digits.

Reproduction
L. edwardsae is oviparous.

References

Further reading
Cogger HG (2014). Reptiles and Amphibians of Australia, Seventh Edition. Clayton, Victoria, Australia: CSIRO Publishing. xxx + 1,033 pp. .
Storr GM (1982). "Four New Lerista (Lacertilia: Scincidae) from Western and South Australia". Records of the Western Australian Museum 10 (1): 1–9. (Lerista picturata edwardsae, new subspecies, pp. 1–4, Figures 1–2).
Storr GM (1991). "Revision of Lerista picturata (Lacertilia: Scincidae) of Southern Australia". Rec. Western Australian Mus. 15 (3): 529–533. (Lerista edwardsae, new taxonomic status, p. 533).
Wilson S, Swan G (2013). A Complete Guide to Reptiles of Australia, Fourth Edition. Sydney: New Holland Publishers. 522 pp. .

Lerista
Reptiles described in 1982
Taxa named by Glen Milton Storr